The Women's Indian Association (WIA) was founded at Adayar, Madras, in 1917 by Annie Besant, Margaret Cousins, Jeena Raja Dasa, and others to liberate women from the deplorable condition women suffered in socio-economic and political matters during the 19th and the early 20th century. The Association later developed into a potent force to fight against illiteracy, child marriage, the Devadasi system and other, social ills. After Besant's death in 1933, Dorothy Jinarajadasa became more involved in the internal politics of theosophists. Unfortunately the faction she supported fell from favour, and her name stopped appearing in all documents from that point onward.

History
The name of the organization was chosen to indicate its inclusive makeup, allowing both Indian and European women to join, and lack of affiliation to any philosophy, religion, caste, or social class. Founded on 8 May 1917, in Adyar, Madras by Margaret E. Cousins, its first president was Annie Besant. Founding members included S. Ambujammal, Kamaladevi Chattopadhyay, Mary Poonen Lukose, Begam Hasrat Mohani, Saralabai Naik, Dhanvanthi Rama Rau, Muthulakshmi Reddy, Mangalammal Sadasivier, and Herabai Tata.

Stri Dharma 
The Stri Dharma was the journal published by the WIA to voice its ideals and beliefs.  It addressed political and social issues facing women in India as well as the achievements of women worldwide.

References

Further reading 
 Women's Indian Association. (1967). The inspiring saga of Women's Indian Association, 1917- 1967. Madras: W.I.A.
 Women's Indian Association. (1967). Women's Indian Association, Madras, India : Golden jubilee celebration, 1917 to 1967. Madras: W.I.A.

External links 
 Stri Dharma available from the British Library

Women's organisations based in India
1917 establishments in British India
Organizations established in 1917